Strodes Mills is a census-designated place located in Oliver and Granville Townships in Mifflin County in the state of Pennsylvania, United States. It is located along U.S. Route 522 in central Mifflin County, between the community of McVeytown and the borough of Lewistown.  As of the 2010 census the population was 757 residents.

References

Census-designated places in Mifflin County, Pennsylvania
Census-designated places in Pennsylvania